The VII South Pacific Mini Games were held July 25-August 4, 2005 in Palau.

Torch lighter was athlete Christopher Silas Adolf, Palau's first Olympian.

Participating countries

Tahiti and Tokelau did not send teams to the games, with Tahiti citing a need to conserve costs.

Sports
12 sports were contested at the 2005 Pacific Mini Games:

Note: Numbers in parentheses indicate the number of events in each sport.

Final medal table
New Caledonia dominated the medal tally, finishing ahead of Fiji. The small nation of Nauru finished in third place with 18 gold medals; all of them gold and won in the weightlifting competition. Host nation Palau also won 18 medals and finished in sixth position on the table.

Notes
 Basketball was included in the 2005 Mini Games in lieu of the FIBA Oceania Tournament. 

 
 
 
 

 
 
 
 As per the Pacific Games Charter:
 Only when five or more competitors compete in an event, will the Gold, Silver and Bronze medal be awarded.
 Where only one competitor competes in an event, no medal is awarded.
 Where two competitors compete in an event, only a Gold Medal will be awarded.
 Where three competitors compete, only a Gold Medal will be awarded
 Where four competitors compete, only a Gold and Silver Medal will be awarded.
 Table Tennis award two bronze medals when a minimum of 5 competitors compete.

References

Sources

Pacific Games by year
Pacific Games
P
South Pacific Mini Games, 2005
 
International sports competitions hosted by Palau
Pacific Mini Games
Pacific Mini Games